Leslie David Baker (born February 19, 1958) is an American actor. He is known for playing disgruntled paper salesman Stanley Hudson in The Office for nine seasons (2005–2013).

Early life

Baker was born on February 19, 1958, in Chicago, Illinois. He graduated from Mendel Catholic College Preparatory High School in Chicago, Illinois in 1976. He holds a B.S. in psychology from Loyola University Chicago and an M.S. in human services administration from Spertus Institute for Jewish Learning and Leadership in Chicago. He taught special education and played an office worker in OfficeMax commercials while working on his MS degree. In Chicago, he worked for the Board of Education, the Department of Public Health, and the Office of Cable and Communications.

Acting career

Baker moved to Los Angeles, California, in the late 1990s.

The Office

Baker had another audition scheduled on the day he was called back for The Office. On his way to his Office audition, he was caught in traffic though producers thought he had been in the bathroom and thanked him for his patience. "By then I was kind of sweaty, my clothes were rumpled, and I was cranky," Baker later said. "The character was written the way I was feeling that day, and I just let 'er rip. Two weeks later I got a call: 'You got the pilot.'"

Baker's Office character, Stanley Hudson, is a sales representative for the fictional Dunder Mifflin paper distributor usually portrayed as a defiant, grouchy curmudgeon. It was said that his performance was "a standout" on the show, and with "his monotone voice and calm demeanor, he played well against the off-the-wall nature of many of the other characters." "Did I Stutter?" (season 4, 2008) has a focus on Baker's character; as with many supporting actors on The Office, some of Baker's scenes became memorable to fans. Stanley is rarely, but sometimes, given a "soft side"; in "Stairmageddon" (season 9, 2013), Baker plays a tranquilized, and then giddy, Stanley. At the conclusion of the series, Stanley says he is happy to be living in retirement in Florida.

He was part of the Office cast which won Screen Actors Guild Awards in the Outstanding Performance by an Ensemble in a Comedy Series category in 2007 and 2008.

In December 2017, after several former Office actors expressed interest in a revival of the series, The Hollywood Reporter Lesley Goldberg said of Baker, "Why wouldn't he return?!" After The Office ended in 2013, The Hollywood Reporter said that Baker has had few roles; Bustle said that he was "plenty busy with his other creative pursuits". In July 2020, Baker launched a Kickstarter campaign to fund the production of a pilot for Uncle Stan, a proposed spin-off series of The Office focusing on Stanley as he moves to Los Angeles, California, to help his widowed nephew Lucky run his failing motorcycle repair/flower shop.

Other work

In 2001, Baker guest-starred in That '70s Show in season 3's "Backstage Pass" as a janitor at the Ted Nugent concert. In November 2011, Baker released the song "2 Be Simple" with an accompanying music video which features Baker (credited as "Black Hugh Hefner") in a bath robe dancing with scantily clad women. "For reasons that remain unclear," wrote Jan Chaney of The Washington Post, "Baker has released ... a track destined to be the party anthem at all your yuletide throwdowns." Cameron Matthews called the song's hook "infectious" with lyrics that "totally [capture] the daydreams of a middle-aged man in crisis."

Baker appeared in Raven's Home as Principal Wentworth; previously, he had small parts in Scorpion and Life in Pieces. He appeared on the CMT series Still the King and in the films Captain Underpants: The First Epic Movie (2017), in a voice role, and The Happytime Murders (2018). He also appeared in a January 2018 advertisement for FileMaker Inc., a subsidiary of Apple Inc., as a farmer alongside former Office actors Paul Lieberstein and Kate Flannery. In 2020 Baker starred in a series of commercials for Honey Nut Cheerios.

Filmography

Television

Film

References

External links

1958 births
Living people
20th-century American male actors
21st-century American male actors
African-American male actors
American male film actors
American male television actors
Loyola University Chicago alumni
Male actors from Chicago
20th-century African-American people
21st-century African-American people